28 Grams is the twelfth mixtape by American rapper Wiz Khalifa. It was released on May 25, 2014, by Taylor Gang Records and Rostrum Records. On the same day, Khalifa was arrested for marijuana possession after security stopped the musician at the airport at El Paso, Texas. He was jailed for a few hours, consequently delaying the release of this mixtape.

Reception 

28 Grams was met with mixed reviews from critics. Bruce Smith from HipHopDX gave the mixtape a two out of five, saying "Experimentation and trying new things with an art form are great. However, when the new things one tries are really just catering to popular trends, it’s less experimentation, and more imitation. Thus, 28 Grams is too all over the place, overall and it feels like too much music, too much Auto-tune, and too much music that sounds as though it was already created by someone else." Joe Sweeney from PopMatters gave the album a 5 out of ten, saying "The rapper breaks into his Flava Flav-esque giggle toward the end, and for once, it feels earned."

Track listing 

Notes
  signifies a co-producer 
  signifies an additional producer
 Track #2 is a remix of Man of the Year by Schoolboy Q
 Track #7 is a remix of Cut Her Off by K Camp
 Track #13 is a remix of Up Down (Do This All Day) by T-Pain
 Track #15 contains a recycled Pimp C verse from a '06 song titled Let's Get 'Em by Don Fetti
 Track #25 is a remix of OG Bobby Johnson by Que

References 

Wiz Khalifa albums
2014 mixtape albums
Albums produced by Juicy J
Albums produced by Zaytoven
Albums produced by Metro Boomin
Albums produced by Sonny Digital
Albums produced by Southside (record producer)
Albums produced by TM88
Albums produced by DJ Mustard
Albums produced by Timbaland